The following articles refer or relate to the subject matter of Australia – New Zealand as a conjoint or unified entity, or otherwise refer or relate to aspects of Australia – New Zealand relations, comparisons between Australia and New Zealand, the culture of Australia – New Zealand, Australia – New Zealand business and other entities, governance and standardisation in Australia-New Zealand, Australia – New Zealand lists and comparisons, the economy of Australia – New Zealand, Australia – New Zealand-focused publications, and individuals with notable affinity to and/or significance for Australia and New Zealand concurrently:

Sport 
 1907–1908 New Zealand rugby tour of Australia and Great Britain
 1908 Melbourne Carnival
 1911–12 Kangaroo tour of Great Britain
 2008 Rugby League World Cup Final
 2013 Rugby League World Cup Final
 2023 FIFA Women's World Cup
 A-League
 Anzac Test
 Australasia at the 1908 Summer Olympics
 Australasia at the 1912 Summer Olympics
 Australasia GAA
 Australasian Super League
 Australasian Championships
 Australasian Intervarsity Debating Championships
 Australasian Safari
 Australasian Breeders Crown
 Australasian Football Council
 Australasian Pacers Grand Circuit
 Australasian Schools English Competition
 Australasian Schools Writing Competition
 Australasian Schools Science Competition
 Australia–New Zealand sports rivalries
 Glossary of Australian and New Zealand punting
 Inter Dominion
 Inter Dominion Pacing Championship
 Inter Dominion Trotting Championship
 Inter Dominion Hall of Fame
 Jubilee Australasian Football Carnival
 National Basketball League (Australasia)
 National Rugby League
 PGA Tour of Australasia
 Super Rugby
 Tasman Series
 V8 Supercars

Business and other entities 
 Anabaptist Association of Australia and New Zealand
 Antiochian Orthodox Archdiocese of Australia, New Zealand, and All Oceania
 ANZ Bank
 Association of Australasian Palaeontologists
 Australasian Legal Information Institute
 Australasian Performing Right Association
 Australasian Division
 Australasian Law Teachers Association
 Australasian Society for Historical Archaeology
 Australasian Plant Pathology Society
 Australasian College of Health Informatics
 Australasian College of Tropical Medicine
 Australasian Trauma Society
 Australasian Society for Computers in Learning in Tertiary Education
 Australasian College of Physical Scientists and Engineers in Medicine
 Australasian Seabird Group
 Australasian College of Health Sciences USA
 Australasian Meat Industry Employees Union
 Australasian Language Technology Association
 Australasian College for Emergency Medicine
 Australasian Police Multicultural Advisory Bureau
 Australasian Association of Philosophy
 Australasian Computer Music Association
 Australasian Union of Jewish Students
 Australasian Society for Experimental Psychology
 Australasian Regional Association of Zoological Parks and Aquaria
 Australasian Wader Studies Group
 Australasian Ornithological Conference
 Australasian Correctional Management
 Australasian Anti-Transportation League
 Australasian Anti-Transportation League Flag
 Australasian Raptor Association
 Australia and New Zealand Association of Clerks-at-the-Table
 Australia and New Zealand School of Government
 Australian and New Zealand Association for the Advancement of Science
 Australian and New Zealand Association of Antiquarian Booksellers
 Australian and New Zealand College of Anaesthetists
 Australian and New Zealand Cultural Arts
 Australia and New Zealand Unitarian Universalist Association
 Australian and New Zealand Society of Indexers
 Australian and New Zealand Law and History Society
 Australian and New Zealand Exchange
 Clean Air Society of Australia and New Zealand
 Fair Trade Association of Australia and New Zealand
 Federal Council of Australasia
 Food Standards Australia New Zealand
 Greek Orthodox Archdiocese of Australia and New Zealand
 Insulation Council of Australia and New Zealand
 Rabbinical College of Australia and New Zealand
 Redemptorists of Australia and New Zealand
 Royal Australasian College of Physicians
 Fellow of the Royal Australasian College of Physicians
 Royal Australasian College of Dental Surgeons
 Royal Australasian College of Surgeons
 Royal Australasian Ornithologists Union
 Royal Australasian Ornithologists Union Fellows
 Royal Australian and New Zealand College of Psychiatrists
 Royal Australian and New Zealand College of Radiologists
 Royal Australian and New Zealand College of Ophthalmologists
 Royal Australian and New Zealand College of Obstetricians and Gynaecologists
 Westpac

Governance and standardisation 
 ANZUS
 Australia–New Zealand Maritime Treaty
 Australian and New Zealand Standard Research Classification
 Australian and New Zealand Standard Industrial Classification
 Australian and New Zealand television frequencies
 Australasian Inter-Service Incident Management System
 Australasian New Car Assessment Program
 Australasian signed English
 British currency in Oceania
 Closer Economic Relations
 Etiquette in Australia and New Zealand
 Joint Accreditation System of Australia and New Zealand

Military, exploration and pioneering efforts 
 ANZAC
 Anzac Bridge
 Anzac Day
 Anzac Parade, Canberra
 Anzac Parade, Sydney
 Australasian Antarctic Expedition
 New Zealand Memorial, Canberra
 Battle of Sari Bair
 British Australian and New Zealand Antarctic Research Expedition
 Crossing the Ditch
 Moncrieff and Hood disappearance
 New Zealand and Australian Division
 Southern Cross (aircraft)
 Southern Cross Cable
 Western Base party

Food, culture, entertainment and architecture 
 Animal Planet (Australia and New Zealand)
 Australasian literature
 Etiquette in Australia and New Zealand
 Glossary of Australian and New Zealand punting
 List of Oceanian films
 Meat pie (Australia and New Zealand)
 Pavlova
 Playhouse Disney (Australia and New Zealand)
 UKTV
 Urban Music Awards Australia and New Zealand

Publications 
 Australian and New Zealand Wine Industry Journal
 Australasian Agribusiness Review
 Australasian Record
 Australasian Post
 Australasian Journal of Philosophy
 Australasian Science
 Australasian Radiology
 Australasian Plant Pathology
 Australasian Journal of Educational Technology
 Australasian Journal of Bone & Joint Medicine
 Emu (journal)
 Handbook of Australian, New Zealand and Antarctic Birds
 We Will Rock You: Australasian Edition

Lists and comparisons 
 List of Australian and New Zealand advertising characters
 List of dental schools in Australia
 Median household income in Australia and New Zealand

Noteworthy individuals

Australian-born 
 Charles Kingsford Smith first Australian to fly to New Zealand
 Carl Berendsen (civil servant/diplomat)
 Keisha Castle-Hughes (actor)
 Frederick Doidge (National)
 Roger Donaldson (film producer)
 Harry Holland (Labour)
 Mabel Howard (Labour)
 Gordon Hultquist (Labour)
 William Larnach (businessman/politician)
 Russel Norman (Green)
 Charles Norwood (businessman)
 Matt Robson (Alliance/Progressive)
 Michael Savage (Labour)
 Bob Semple (Labour)
 Jerry Skinner (Labour)
 Esme Tombleson (National)
 Hugh Watt (Labour)
 Joseph Ward (Liberal)
 Paddy Webb (Labour)

British-born 
 James Cook  - coastal explorer of Australia and New Zealand
 Edward Gibbon Wakefield - proponent of the colonisation of South Australia and New Zealand

New Zealand-born 

 Joh Bjelke-Petersen
 Adam Campbell (Australian footballer)
 John Clarke a.k.a. 'Fred Dagg'
 Trent Croad
 Russell Crowe
 Donald Dickie
 William Hudson
 Harry Haughton
 Warren Jones (footballer)
 Jay Laga'aia
 Thomas O'Halloran
 Brent Renouf
 Ricky May
 Daniel McAlister
 Joe Sellwood
 Marty McDonnell
 Mike Rann
 Wayne Schwass
 Pamela Stephenson
 Phar Lap (racehorse) 
 Nancy Wake
 Richard Wilkins
 Barney Wood

Other 
 Australia–New Zealand relations

Indexes of topics by region

Lists of topics